Arsan may refer to:
 ARSAN
 Emmanuelle Arsan
 Sünuhi Arsan
 Arsan Duolai